An election to the Carmarthenshire County Council was held in March 1946. The 1940 and 1943 elections were postponed due to the Second World War, therefore the election was preceded by the 1937 election and followed, by the 1949 election.

Overview of the result

The Independents retained their majority despite a strong Labour challenge, which saw an increase in the number of candidates contesting wards outside of the industrial south and east of the county. Retiring aldermen were also obliged to face the electorate before being re-elected to the bench.

Boundary changes

There were no boundary changes.

Unopposed returns

There were a number of unopposed returns, notably in Labour-held seats.

Contested elections

Many wards were keenly contested following the reinstatement of electoral politics after nine years.

In the Llanelli and Ammanford areas, Labour won ground, particularly in Llanelli town where three wards were gained from the Independents. Labour also defeated the sitting Independent at Llangeler (a rural ward where the party had been successful once before largely due to the prevalence of the woolen industry). Labour also won the St Ishmaels ward for the first time.

Another feature was that long-serving aldermen faced the electorate. A notable contest took place in Cwmamman where Alderman John Phillips, a member of the Council since 1922 narrowly defeated the sitting Labour councillor David Davies. In Carmarthen Town, Alderman William Price Williams was defeated by the retiring Independent, as was Alderman Evan Harris at Llansawel.

Summary of results

This section summarises the detailed results which are noted in the following sections. In some cases there is an ambiguity in the sources over the party affiliations and this is explained below where relevant.

This table summarises the result of the elections in all wards. 53 councillors were elected.

|}

|}

|}

Ward results

Abergwili

Ammanford No.1
Boundary Change.

Ammanford No.2
Boundary Change.

Berwick

Burry Port
Boundary Change.

Caio

Carmarthen Division 1

Carmarthen Division 2

Carmarthen Division 3

Cenarth

Cilycwm

Conwil

Cwmamman

Hengoed

Kidwelly

Laugharne

Llanarthney

Llanboidy

Llandebie North

Llandebie South

Llandilo Rural

Llandilo Urban

Llandovery

Llandyssilio

Llanedy

Llanegwad

Llanelly Division.1

Llanelly Division 2
Boundary Change

Llanelly Division 3

Llanelly Division 4

Llanelly Division 5
Boundary Change

Llanelly Division 6
Boundary Change

Llanelly Division 7
Boundary Change

Llanelly Division 8

Llanelly Division 9

Llanfihangel Aberbythick

Llanfihangel-ar-Arth

Llangadog

Llangeler

Llangendeirne

Llangennech

Llangunnor

Llanon

Llansawel

Llanstephan

Llanybyther

Myddfai

Pembrey
Boundary Change

Pontyberem
Boundary Change

Quarter Bach

Rhydcymmerai

St Clears

St Ishmaels

Trelech

Trimsaran
Boundary Change

Westfa

Whitland

Election of aldermen

In addition to the 57 councillors the council consisted of 19 county aldermen. Aldermen were elected by the council, and served a six-year term. Following the elections the following nine aldermen were elected (with the number of votes in each case).

References

1946
1946 Welsh local elections